Ador may refer to:

People
 Ador Gjuci (born 1998), Italian-born Albanian football player
 Galo Ador Jr. (1969–2008), Filipino comic book author
 Gustave Ador (1845–1928), Swiss politician

Places
 Ador, Valencia, Spain

Other
 A.D.O.R.
 Ador Group
 Ador Welding

See also
 Adore (disambiguation)